José Blanco López (born 6 February 1962), also known as Pepe Blanco, is a Spanish socialist politician. He was the deputy general of the Spanish Socialist Workers' Party (PSOE) and was the Minister of Public Works and Transport from 2009 to 2011.

Political career
Blanco López began his political career in 1986 when he was elected to the Spanish Senate. In 1996 he was elected to the Spanish Congress as a deputy for Lugo Province and was re-elected in 2000, 2004 and 2008. He is a trustee of the Fundacion IDEAS, Spain's Socialist Party's think tank.

Blanco López was appointed Minister of Public Works and Transport in a cabinet reshuffle on 7 April 2009, replacing Magdalena Álvarez. On July 11, 2011 he was appointed spokesperson of the government without losing previous duties.

Controversy
On 28 December 2011 Spain's Supreme Court opened a probe into Blanco López's conduct on charges of influence peddling and accepting bribes. In 2013, the Spanish Supreme Court dismissed the case against him for those charges. In 2011, José Blanco received the Grand Cross of the Order of Carlos III from the new Prime Minister, Mariano Rajoy.

Other activities 
 Enagás, Independent Member of the Board of Directors

References

1962 births
Living people
People from Lugo
Members of the 6th Congress of Deputies (Spain)
Members of the 7th Congress of Deputies (Spain)
Members of the 8th Congress of Deputies (Spain)
Members of the 9th Congress of Deputies (Spain)
Spanish Socialist Workers' Party politicians
Government ministers of Spain
MEPs for Spain 2014–2019
Public works ministers of Spain